Darwin "Dee" Davis (born March 10, 1993) is an American professional basketball player for Haukar of the Úrvalsdeild karla. He played college basketball for Xavier.

Professional career 

After going undrafted in the 2015 NBA draft, Davis joined the NBA Development League team Canton Charge for the training camp. In December 2015, Davis signed his first professional contract with Slovenian club Rogaška. In the 2016–2017 season Davis was named to First Team Slovenian League, First Team All-Imports Team, All-Defensive Team and Slovenian Guard of the Year.

On June 9, 2017, Davis signed with German club Gießen 46ers. He averaged 13.5 points and 4.6 assists per game with the 46ers. On July 5, 2018 he joined the French club Nantes Basket.

In August 2022, Davis signed with Haukar of the Úrvalsdeild karla.

Statistics

College statistics

References

External links 

 Eurobasket.com profile
 FIBA profile
 REALGM profile

1993 births
Living people
21st-century African-American sportspeople
African-American basketball players
American expatriate basketball people in France
American expatriate basketball people in Germany
American expatriate basketball people in Iceland
American expatriate basketball people in Slovenia
American men's basketball players
Basketball players from Indiana
Giessen 46ers players
Haukar men's basketball players
Point guards
Sportspeople from Bloomington, Indiana
Úrvalsdeild karla (basketball) players
Xavier Musketeers men's basketball players